Hawk Rise Sanctuary is a  ecological preserve and wetland complex in Linden, New Jersey, bordering the Rahway River. It is at the lower reaches of the Rahway River Parkway.

It was created in 2012 on a former landfill through the combined efforts of the New Jersey Department of Environmental Protection, the city of Linden and the New Jersey Audubon Society. The natural area was once hidden behind a variety of industrial land uses.

A boardwalk  and scenic walking trail system winds through the Hawk Rise forest, continues along the edge of the former Linden Landfill, and leads to an overlook viewing of the Rahway River and adjacent marshes. 

The site contains a surprising diversity of habitats for its relatively small size and urban location. These include forested wetlands, vernal pools, grasslands, shrublands, salt marsh, mudflats, a large pond, and the tidal Rahway River. 163 bird species have been spotted there.

In 2022, a solar farm opened on the site.

See also
Rahway River Parkway
ExxonMobil-New Jersey environmental contamination settlement

References

Protected areas of Union County, New Jersey
Nature reserves in New Jersey
Linden, New Jersey
Rahway River